Diminished may refer to:
Diminution in music
"Diminished" (R.E.M. song), from the 1998 album Up